José María Sánchez Lage, also known as "Sánchez Lage", was an Argentine professional footballer who played as a winger for several clubs including River Plate and Club Atlético Banfield in Argentina and Real Oviedo and Valencia C.F. in Spain .

His former teammate and friend Paquito said: "He was the second Di Stéfano in Spain."

References

1931 births
2005 deaths
Footballers from Buenos Aires
Argentine footballers
Club Atlético Huracán footballers
Club Atlético River Plate footballers
Real Oviedo players
Valencia CF players
Association football midfielders
Argentine expatriate sportspeople in Spain